Susan Walsh (February 18, 1960 – disappeared July 16, 1996) was an American writer and freelance journalist who disappeared outside her home in Nutley, New Jersey, on July 16, 1996. Her disappearance was widely publicized into the late 1990s, especially after several newspapers and media outlets published articles implying that her disappearance was potentially linked to the Russian mafia or New York City's underground vampire community, both subjects that she had investigated while writing for The Village Voice.

Walsh's case has been profiled on multiple television programs, including Unsolved Mysteries in 1997 and Disappeared in 2012. She was the subject of a 1998 book titled Piercing the Darkness: Undercover with Vampires in America Today by Katherine Ramsland.

Early life
Susan Walsh was born Susan Young on February 18, 1960. She aspired to be a poet from a young age. Walsh attended William Paterson University where she studied English and writing; while there, she was employed as a journalist for the university newspaper. Walsh worked intermittently as an erotic dancer and stripper to help pay her tuition. Notwithstanding her struggles with substance abuse and alcoholism, she graduated from college with a bachelor's degree in 1988 and then worked as a writer for engineering and business publications. She was later employed as a writer for Screw magazine.

In 1984, she married Mark Walsh, a brother of musician Joe Walsh. The couple had one son, David, born in 1985.

Disappearance
On July 16, 1996, Walsh left her apartment complex in Nutley, New Jersey, which she shared with her son; her estranged husband, Mark, lived below them. Walsh had left to run errands and make a telephone call at a payphone across the street, leaving her son for the time being in the care of his father. It was the last time that Walsh was seen. At the time of her disappearance, she had been enrolled in a Master's program in English at New York University, which she had halfway completed, while supporting herself and her son by working as a freelance journalist and in various jobs as a stripper. At the time of her disappearance, her friends had become worried that she had relapsed into her drug addiction, after having maintained 11 years of sobriety.

Investigation
Police were able to eliminate Walsh's ex-husband as a suspect in her disappearance. It was noted later that the page for the entire month of July 1996 was missing from Walsh's calendar in her apartment. Although police had few clues to follow up on in their investigation, rumors circulated that Walsh's disappearance might have been connected to the investigative journalism she had been doing at the time.

Walsh had penned an in-depth report published in The Village Voice about a strip club ring in which members of the Russian mafia were allegedly forcing young girls into the sex industry. Following this article, Walsh had also explored an underground vampire community in New York City, but the newspaper did not run the story as it felt Walsh's writing on the matter was not objective. Ultimately, police were unable to establish any connections between Walsh's disappearance and her work on either article. Walsh established a friendship with journalist James Ridgeway during her time writing for the Voice, with Ridgeway referring to her as his "most reliable" writer.

At the time, Walsh had also participated in a documentary produced by her friend, Jill Morley, titled Stripped, which detailed women working in the sex industry. Walsh was recorded in a group interview for the film on July 14, 1996, two days before her disappearance, during which she made a reference to having a "stalker." She had also hired herself out to a German documentary crew making a film about Russian immigrants becoming go-go dancers, and was also in the midst of developing a documentary on the subject with the BBC shortly before her disappearance. Walsh's last work was her contributions to the book Red Light: Inside the Sex Industry by Ridgeway and Sylvia Plachy; Walsh served as the primary researcher for the book and also contributed photographs and personal writings within a month before her disappearance.

In a 2006 article in The New York Post, it was noted that Walsh had confided to a former boyfriend that another of her ex-boyfriends had been stalking her; additionally, the article stated that her husband, Mark, had refused to allow police to perform forensic testing of their home.

Works
Known bibliography
 Screw Magazine
 The Village Voice (2 articles)
 Red Light: Inside the Sex Industry by James Ridgeway; Sylvia Plachy (primary researcher, contributor) 

Filmography
 Stripped (2001) as herself

See also
Investigative journalism
List of people who disappeared mysteriously

References

Notes

Sources

External links
 Susan Walsh at The Charley Project
 Susan Walsh at Unsolved.com

1960 births
1990s missing person cases
American erotic dancers
American female erotic dancers
American women journalists
July 1996 events in the United States
Missing people
Missing person cases in New Jersey
New York University alumni
People from Wayne, New Jersey
William Paterson University alumni